Duncan Hunter may refer to:

Duncan D. Hunter (born 1976), member of the U.S. House of Representatives from California (2009–2020)
Duncan L. Hunter (born 1948), member of the U.S. House of Representatives from California (1981–2009)

See also